Hyman Barnett "Harry" Mizler (22 January 1913 – March 1990) was an English boxer who competed for Great Britain in the 1932 Summer Olympics and won the British BBoC Lightweight title in January 1934.

Early life and amateur career
Mizler was born in Wicket Street, St Georges in the heart of the East End of London to Jewish parents.  They had a fish stall in Watney Street Market and after leaving school he worked in the stall along with his brothers Moe and Judah, who also boxed.  He had a stellar amateur career, winning the Federation of Working Men's Club's Bantamweight championship in 1929–30, and in 1932-3 held the ABA Amateur Bantamweight title.

Competing at only seventeen in the 1930 Empire Games in Hamilton, Canada, he took the gold medal in the bantamweight class after winning the final against Tommy Holt of Scotland.

In 1932 he was eliminated in the first round of the lightweight class at the Los Angeles Olympic Games, after losing his bout to the eventual bronze medalist Nathan Bor of the United States.  His manager Victor Berliner was well known in British boxing circles.

As a professional Mizler had boxing ability, punch and the ability to take punishment. He was a classic stylist who used with devastating effect the textbook English straight left which most present day fighters are taught, but few perfect.

Taking the BBoC British lightweight title, Jan 1934
On 18 January 1934, he defeated Johnny Cuthbert in fifteen rounds at Kensington's Royal Albert Hall for the British Board of Control (BBofC) lightweight title. Greatly more experienced and accomplished, Cuthbert was the 1927 BBoC British featherweight champion.  Nonetheless, showing immense talent at an early stage in his career, Mizler's title victory was only his tenth professional fight. Cuthbert was more aggressive in the early rounds, but was unable to connect with sting in his blows, but Mizler's defense improved throughout the fight and he was often brilliant in the use of his left against Cuthbert.  In the third and fourth, Mizler clearly began to use his left more effectively.  In the closing two rounds, Mizler finally had enough of an advantage to try for a knockout against his opponent but was unable.  Cuthbert had continued to connect with blows in previous rounds, but with less frequency and with less effect than Mizler.  It was a fast and clean fight, and the referee had little need to call fouls. 

He successfully defended the BBoC British lightweight title only once, however, against Billy Quinlan on 4 August 1934 at Swansea, Wales, in a fifteen-round points decision.

Loss of lightweight title, Oct 1934
He lost the title on 29 October 1934 at the Royal Albert Hall in Kensington, London, to the vastly more experienced Jewish boxer Jack Kid Berg when his seconds threw in the towel at the end of the tenth of a scheduled fifteen round bout.  Mizzler was said to have "received a ceaseless drubbing from Berg's busy fists", with Berg using both hands against the face of his younger opponent.  Berg pulled ahead decisively after the first two rounds.  Mizzler's defense was good, and he fought well at long range as was the English custom with a studied punch ready when needed, but he was no match against the relentless two handed attack of Berg who showed greater speed and dominated the infighting, throwing a vicious left to the jaw in the third that put Mizler to the ropes.  Mizler could not defend Berg's left hooks to the jaw, and had to retire by the end of the tenth.

On 2 October 1935, he fought one of his most exciting bouts, a dramatic come from behind knock out in the eight round against Gustave Hummery of France. Mizler was down four times for a count of nine, and once for a count of eight when he was saved by the bell.  Staying on his feet, when a left-right combination to Hummery's jaw put him down in the eighth, Hummery's handlers threw in the towel to end what would be remembered as a grueling bout for both combatants.

Mizler first took the BBofC Southern Area lightweight title against Norman Snow in a fifteen-round points decision at Northampton on 2 December 1935.

On 19 October 1936, Mizzler attempted to take the British lightweight championship for a second time against Jimmy Walsh, but lost in a fifteen-round decision in Kensington.  It would be his last championship bout, but certainly not his last fight, as he would continue boxing til 1944.

He lost a ten-round decision to NBA featherweight champion Petey Sarron on 15 April 1937, in Harrington, England.  On 15 November 1937, Mizzler defeated American lightweight contender Al Roth in a ten-round points decision in Kensington.  Roth broke two bones in his right hand and was told by the ringside physician to take a two-month break from competition.

In a return bout with American featherweight champion Sarron five months later in Johannesburg, South Africa, Sarron was disqualified for a low blow in the first round.  It was the first and only time, Mizler would fight outside the United Kingdom. The bout, however, was not for the title, as both boxers were over the 125 pound featherweight weight limit.

Life after boxing
In WWII, Mizler was called to serve in the British Royal Air Force in 1940 and served for the duration of the war.  As physical training  instructor, he devoted his abilities to teaching thousands of airmen the rudiments of boxing until he had to leave the Air Force due to stomach ailments.  After the war he made a good living as an entrepreneur in the garment center. 

He died in Wandsworth, Greater London, England, in March 1990.

Selected fights

|-
| align="center" colspan=8|6 Wins, 4 Losses 
|-
| align="center" style="border-style: none none solid solid; background: #e3e3e3"|Result
| align="center" style="border-style: none none solid solid; background: #e3e3e3"|Opponent(s)
| align="center" style="border-style: none none solid solid; background: #e3e3e3"|Date
| align="center" style="border-style: none none solid solid; background: #e3e3e3"|Location
| align="center" style="border-style: none none solid solid; background: #e3e3e3"|Duration
| align="center" style="border-style: none none solid solid; background: #e3e3e3"|Notes
|-
| Win
| Johnny Cuthbert
| 18 Jan 1934
| Kensington, West End, London
| 15 Rounds
| Won BBoC Brit. Light title
|-
| Win
| Billy Quinlan
| 4 Aug 1934
| Swansea, Wales
| 15 Rounds  
| Kept Brit. Light title
|-
| Loss
| Jack Kid Berg
| 29 Oct 1934
| Kensington, London
| 10th Round TKO
| Lost Brit. Light title
|-
| Win
| Gustave Hummery
| 2 Oct 1935
| Kensington, London
| 8th Round TKO  
|   
|-
| Win
| Norman Snow
| 2 Dec 1935
| Northampton, Eng.
| 15 Rounds 
| Won BBoC Southern Light title 
|-
| Loss
| Jimmy Walsh
| 19 Oct 1936
| Kensington, London
| 15 Rounds 
| For BBoC Brit. Light title 
|-
| Win
| Petey Sarron
| 15 Apr 1937
| Johannesberg, SA
| 1st Round DQLow blow, Non-title 
| Sarron-World feather champ
|-
| Loss
| Petey Sarron
| 19 Jun 1937
| Harringay, North London
| 10 Rounds 
| Sarron-World feather champ
|-
| Win
| Al Roth
| 15 Nov 1937
| Kensington, London
| 10 Rounds 
| Roth broke hand
|-
| Loss
| Jack Kid Berg
| 27 Feb 1941
| Cambridge Theatre
| 10 Rounds 
|

References

External links
 
 jewsinsports.org
 

1913 births
1990 deaths
Boxers from Greater London
English male boxers
English Jews
Jewish boxers
Bantamweight boxers
Featherweight boxers
Lightweight boxers
Olympic boxers of Great Britain
Boxers at the 1932 Summer Olympics
Boxers at the 1930 British Empire Games
Commonwealth Games gold medallists for England
Commonwealth Games medallists in boxing
Medallists at the 1930 British Empire Games